Edward Norman Cahn (born June 29, 1933) is a former United States district judge of the United States District Court for the Eastern District of Pennsylvania.

Education and career

Cahn was born in Allentown, Pennsylvania. He attended Lehigh University, where he played basketball and set a record by becoming the first Lehigh student to score 1,000 points; he graduated magna cum laude with a Bachelor of Arts degree in 1955. Cahn continued to Yale Law School, where he earned a Bachelor of Laws in 1958. After graduation from law school, he entered private practice in Allentown, and began service in the  United States Marine Corps Reserve, achieving the rank of Corporal. He left the service in 1964.

Federal judicial service

Cahn was nominated by President Gerald Ford on November 18, 1974, to a seat on the United States District Court for the Eastern District of Pennsylvania vacated by Judge John Morgan Davis. He was confirmed by the United States Senate on December 18, 1974, and received his commission on December 20, 1974. He served as Chief Judge from 1993 to 1998. His service terminated on December 31, 1998, due to his retirement.

Post judicial service

Since his retirement from the federal bench, he has served as of counsel to Blank Rome, where he remains active as of June 2018. He was appointed and approved as Chapter 11 case trustee for the SCO Group on August 25, 2009.

Honor

On August 20, 2001, the Edward N. Cahn Federal Building and United States Courthouse was renamed in his honor.

References

Sources

External links
 

1933 births
Living people
Basketball players from Pennsylvania
Judges of the United States District Court for the Eastern District of Pennsylvania
Lehigh Mountain Hawks men's basketball players
Sportspeople from Allentown, Pennsylvania
United States district court judges appointed by Gerald Ford
20th-century American judges
United States Marines
Yale Law School alumni
American men's basketball players
United States Marine Corps reservists